The third season of Bates Motel consisted of 10 episodes and broadcast on A&E from March 9-May 11, 2015, airing on Mondays at 9 p.m. ET/PT. The series itself is described as a "contemporary prequel" to the 1960 film Psycho, following the life of Norman Bates and his mother Norma prior to the events portrayed in the Hitchcock film. The series takes place in the fictional town of White Pine Bay, Oregon. 

The season received positive reviews from television critics, and the premiere episode drew in a total of 2.14 million viewers. For their performances in this season, Vera Farmiga and Freddie Highmore were nominated for Critics' Choice Television Awards for Best Actress and Best Actor in a Drama Series, respectively. Season 3 ranked fourth on Nielsen's year-end list of top Live + 7 day programs, gaining an average of 201.8% viewers on DVR. The season was released on Blu-ray and DVD on October 13, 2015.

Cast and characters

Main

 Vera Farmiga as Norma Louise Bates
 Freddie Highmore as Norman Bates
 Max Thieriot as Dylan Massett
 Olivia Cooke as Emma Decody
 Kenny Johnson as Caleb Calhoun
 Nestor Carbonell as Sheriff Alex Romero

Recurring
 Kevin Rahm as Bob Paris
 Keenan Tracey as Gunner
 Ryan Hurst as Chick Hogan
 Joshua Leonard as James Finnigan
 Peter Stebbings as Bob's Employee
 Adetomiwa Edun as Marcus Young
 Andrew Howard as Will Decody
 Nicola Peltz as Bradley Martin
 Tracy Spiridakos as Annika Johnson
 Anika Noni Rose as Liz Babbitt

Guest
 Wilson Bethel as Taylor
 Emiliano Díez as Alex's Dad
 Tom McBeath as Stanley
 Keegan Connor Tracy as Miss Blair Watson

Production

Casting
Nicola Peltz returned to the series as Bradley Martin following an 8-episode absence in season 2. Kenny Johnson was upgraded to the main cast after recurring as Caleb Calhoun, Norma's brother, in the second season. Ryan Hurst was cast in the recurring role of Chick Hogan, described as a character that will butt heads with Caleb throughout the season. Tracy Spiridakos was then confirmed to star in the recurring role of Annika Johnson, a guest at the motel. Kevin Rahm joined the cast as Bob Paris, one of Romero's childhood friends whom he now has a strained relationship with. Joshua Leonard was cast in the recurring role of James Finnigan, a community college psychology professor who forms a connection with Norma.

Filming
The series was filmed on location in Aldergrove, British Columbia. At the beginning of the first season, a replica of the original Bates Motel set from the film Psycho was built on 272nd Street. Principal photography for season 3 began on October 20, 2014 in Vancouver and the surrounding areas, and was completed on March 1, 2015. During an interview in June 2015, Farmiga revealed that she was injured while filming the final scene of the season with Nicola Peltz and Freddie Highmore, resulting in her having to go to the emergency room.

Episodes

Reception

Critical response
The season has received positive reviews from television critics. It received 72 out of 100 from Metacritic, based on 5 television critic reviews, indicating "generally favorable reviews". Review aggregator website Rotten Tomatoes reported that 11 out of 12 critical responses were positive, averaging a 92% rating. The site's consensus reads, "Bates Motel further blurs lines around TV's creepiest taboo mother/son relationship, uncomfortably darkening its already fascinating tone".

Ratings
Overall, the third season averaged 1.80 million viewers, with a 0.7 ratings share in the 18–49 demographic.

 A  Cable Live +3 data is used here as Live +7 was not made available.

Awards and nominations

In its third season, Bates Motel was nominated for 10 awards, winning one.

References

External links
 
 

2015 American television seasons
Season 3